Aleksey Alekseyevich Muldarov (born 24 April 1984) is a Kazakhstani professional football coach and a former player. He is the manager of Russian club Dynamo Stavropol.

Career
In February 2013, he left FC Mordovia Saransk by mutual agreement.
In December 2014, Muldarov left FC Aktobe.

In January 2016, Muldarov signed for FC Atyrau, before returning to FC Kaisar in January 2017.

Career statistics

Club

International

Statistics accurate as of match played 11 October 2013

Honours
 Russian Second Division, Zone Ural-Povolzhye best defender: 2009.
 Football Championship of the National League winner: 2011/12

Aktobe
Kazakhstan Super Cup (1): 2014

References

External links
 

1984 births
Living people
People from Tskhinvali
Kazakhstani footballers
Kazakhstan international footballers
Footballers from Georgia (country)
FC Mordovia Saransk players
FC Aktobe players
FC Kaisar players
FC Shakhter Karagandy players
FC Atyrau players
Russian Premier League players
Kazakhstan Premier League players
Expatriate footballers in Russia
Expatriate footballers in Kazakhstan
Expatriate sportspeople from Georgia (country) in Russia
Expatriate sportspeople from Georgia (country) in Kazakhstan
Association football central defenders
Kazakhstani football managers